The following are the football events of the year 1936 throughout the world.

Events
 Foundation of Beitar Jerusalem F.C.

Winners club national championship 
 Argentina: River Plate
 England: Sunderland
 France: RC Paris
 Italy: Bologna
 Netherlands: Feyenoord Rotterdam
 Paraguay: Olimpia Asunción
 Poland: Ruch Chorzów
 Romania: Ripensia Timișoara
 Scotland: 
Division One: Celtic F.C.
Scottish Cup: Rangers F.C.
 Spain: Athletic Bilbao
 Soviet Union: see 1936 in Soviet football

International tournaments
1936 British Home Championship (October 5, 1935 – April 4, 1936)

Olympic Games in Berlin, Germany (August 3 – 15 1936)

Births
 January 6 – Anton Allemann, Swiss international footballer (died 2008)
 January 9 – Ion Nunweiller, Romanian international footballer (died 2015)
 January 16 – Tinus Bosselaar, Dutch footballer (died 2018)
 February 2 – Metin Oktay, Turkish international footballer (died 1991)
 February 7 – Luis Santibañez, Chilean football manager (died 2008)
 March 10 – Sepp Blatter, 8th President of FIFA
 April 25 – Leonel Sánchez, Chilean international footballer (died 2022)
 June 22 – Ferran Olivella, Spanish footballer
 July 2 –  Eusebio Escobar, Colombian footballer
 September 20 – Salvador Reyes Monteón, Mexican football player (died 2012)
 October 9 – Sverre Andersen, Norwegian international footballer (died 2016)
 November 5 – Uwe Seeler, German international footballer

Deaths 
 March 9 – Alexander Watson Hutton, Scottish sportsman, founder of the Argentine Football Association and Alumni Athletic Club. (82)

References

 
Association football by year
Association football clubs established in 1936